The following is a list, by decade, of ballets created by the English choreographer Frederick Ashton.

1920s
 A Tragedy of Fashion (music by Eugene Goossens, arranged by Ernest Irving) (1926)
 Various dances for a Purcell Opera Society production of The Fairy-Queen: (music by Henry Purcell) (1927)
 Pas de deux (music by Fritz Kreisler) (1927)
 Suite de danses (music by Wolfgang Amadeus Mozart) (1927)
 Argentine Dance (music by Artello) (1927)
 Nymphs and Shepherds (music by Wolfgang Amadeus Mozart) (1928)
 Leda (music by Christoph Willibald Gluck) (1928)
 Various dances for Jew Süss (incidental music arranged by Constant Lambert) (1929)

1930s
 Capriol Suite (music by Peter Warlock) (1930)
 Pomona (music by Constant Lambert) (1930)
 Regatta (music by Gavin Gordon) (1931)
  (music by Léo Delibes) (1931)
  (music by William Walton) (1931)
 The Lady of Shalott (music by Jean Sibelius) (1931)
  (music by Lord Berners) (1932)
 Les Masques (music by Francis Poulenc) (1933)
   (music by Daniel Auber, arranged by Constant Lambert) (1933)
  (music by Maurice Ravel) (1933)
  (music by Franz Liszt) (1934)
    (music by Igor Stravinsky)  (1935)
 Apparitions (music by Franz Liszt, arranged by Constant Lambert and orchestrated by Gordon Jacob) (1936)
 Nocturne (music by Frederick Delius) (1936)
   (music by Giacomo Meyerbeer, arranged by Constant Lambert)  (1937 )
 A Wedding Bouquet (music by Lord Berners) (1937)
 Horoscope (music by Constant Lambert) (1938)
 The Judgement of Paris (music by Lennox Berkeley) (1938)
 Cupid and Psyche (music by Lord Berners) (1939)

1940s
 Dante Sonata (music by Franz Liszt, orchestrated by Constant Lambert) (1940)
 The Wise Virgins (music by J S Bach, orchestrated by William Walton), (1940)
 The Wanderer (music by Franz Schubert) (1941)
 The Quest (music by William Walton) (1943)
 Symphonic Variations (music by César Franck) (1946)
 Les Sirènes (music by Lord Berners, orchestrated by Roy Douglas) (1946)
 various dances for a Royal Opera production of The Fairy-Queen (music by Henry Purcell, arranged by Constant Lambert) (1946)
 Valses nobles et sentimentales (music by Maurice Ravel) (1947)
 Scènes de ballet (music by Igor Stravinsky) (1948)
 Don Juan (music by Richard Strauss) (1948)
 Cinderella  (music by Sergei Prokofiev) (1948)
 Le Rêve de Léonor (music by Benjamin Britten, orchestrated by Arthur Oldham) (1949)

1950s
 Illuminations (music by Benjamin Britten) (1950)
   (music by Maurice Ravel) (1951), created for Margot Fonteyn and Michael Somes
 Tiresias (music by Constant Lambert) (1951)
 Sylvia (music by Léo Delibes) (1952)
 Picnic at Tintagel (music by Arnold Bax) (1952)
 Homage to the Queen (music by Malcolm Arnold) (1953)
 Madame Chrysanthème (music by Alan Rawsthorne) (1955)
 Romeo and Juliet (music by Sergei Prokofiev) (1955)
 Rinaldo and Armida (music by Malcolm Arnold) (1955)
  (music by Paul Dukas) (1956)
 Birthday Offering (music by Alexander Glazunov, arranged by Robert Irving) (1956)
   (music by Hans Werner Henze) (1958), created for Dame Margot Fonteyn
   (music by  Maurice Ravel) (1958)

1960s
  (music by Ferdinand Hérold - John Lanchbery  (1960)
 Persephone (music by Igor Stravinsky) (1961)
 The Two Pigeons (music by André Messager, arranged by  John Lanchbery) (1961)
 Marguerite and Armand (music by Franz Liszt, orchestrated by Humphrey Searle) 1963). Soloists: Margot Fonteyn and Rudolf Nureyev
 The Dream after Shakespeare's  A Midsummer Night's Dream  (music by Felix Mendelssohn, some music arranged by John Lanchbery) (1964)
 Monotones (music by Erik Satie, orchestrated by Claude Debussy) (1965)
 Jazz Calendar (music by Richard Rodney Bennett) (1968)
 Enigma Variations  (music by Edward Elgar) (1968)

1970s
  (The Creatures of Prometheus) (music by Ludwig van Beethoven) (1970)
 Lament of the Waves (music by Gérard Masson) (1970)
 The Walk to the Paradise Garden (music by Frederick Delius) (1972)
 Five Brahms Waltzes in the Manner of Isadora Duncan (music by Johannes Brahms) (1976) (expanded from Brahms Waltz, 1975)
 A Month in the Country  (music by Frédéric Chopin, arranged by John Lanchbery) (1976)
 Voices of Spring (music by Johann Strauss II) (1977)

1980s
 Rhapsody (music by Sergei Rachmaninoff) (1980)
  (music by Gioachino Rossini) (1982)
 La chatte métamorphosée en femme (music by Jacques Offenbach) (1985)

 List of ballets choreographed by Frederick Ashton
Ashton, Frederick, Ballets, List of, choreographed by